Donji Štoj is a village in the municipality of Ulcinj, Montenegro. Donji Štoj is located on the first half of the Long Beach, Adriatic Sea. On the north side of the village is saline - park "Bajo Sekulić".

Demographics
According to the 2011 census, its population was 1,120.

References

Populated places in Ulcinj Municipality
Albanian communities in Montenegro